Paerisades IV Philometor seems to have been a Spartocid king of the Bosporan Kingdom from c. 150 to 125 BC.

Reign

He was presumably the eldest son of Paerisades III, and his first wife Kamasarye. He took the surname "Philometor" to show a relationship with his mother, whom he presumably cared for very much. Little to nothing is known about his reign or his death apart from his coinage and a genealogical tree created by Ferdinand Justi, only that he succeeded Paerisades III in 150 BC and that he was succeeded by his presumably younger brother Paerisades V in 125 BC.

Succession
Paerisades V would rule until c. 108 BC, and he would be the last Spartocid ruler of the Bosporan Kingdom, handing the kingdom to Mithridates VI, the famous king of Pontus. His death marked the ending of a dynasty that lasted for three centuries in the Cimmerian Bosporus.

See also
Spartocids

References

External links
 Collection of coinage

Monarchs of the Bosporan Kingdom
2nd-century BC rulers
Spartocid dynasty